Elections to Bolton Metropolitan Borough Council were held on in May 1975. The Conservatives retained control of the Council.

23 seats were contested, with 18 being won by the Conservative Party, 4 by the Labour Party and 1 by the Liberal Party.

After the election, the composition of the Council was

Conservative 42
Labour 23
Liberal Party 3
Independent 1

Election result

Ward results

Astley Bridge ward

Bradshaw North and South ward

Bradford ward

Bromley Cross, Eagley and Egerton ward

Church East and North ward

Darcy Lever cum Breightmet ward

Deane cum Lostock ward

Derby ward

Farnworth North ward

Farnworth South ward

Great Lever ward

Halliwell ward

Heaton ward

Horwich North, Central and East ward

Horwich South and Blackrod ward

Hulton and Rumworth ward

Kearsley ward

Little Lever ward

Smithills ward

Tonge ward

West ward

Westhoughton East and Hulton ward

Westhoughton North, Central and South ward

References

 

1975
1975 English local elections
1970s in Greater Manchester